The 2021 Honkbal Hoofdklasse season began on Thursday, April 29.

Standings

References

Honkbal Hoofdklasse
2021 in baseball